Osmaniye Province is a province in south-central Turkey. It was named Cebel-i Bereket in the early republic until 1933, when it was incorporated into Adana Province. It was made a province again in 1996. It covers an area of 3,767 km and has a population of 557,160.  The province is situated in Çukurova, a geographical, economical and cultural region. The capital of the province is Osmaniye. Other major towns include Kadirli and Düziçi.

Geography

Osmaniye Province is mainly under hot-summer Mediterranean climate (Csa) according to Köppen climate classification system.

Districts 

Osmaniye province is divided into 7 districts (capital district in bold):
 Bahçe
 Düziçi
 Hasanbeyli
 Kadirli
 Osmaniye
 Sumbas
 Toprakkale

Historical sites and ruins 
 Karatepe
 Karatepe

Attractions 
 Kastabala ancient city 
 Toprakkale Castle
 Harun Reşit Kalesi

Churches 
 Kırk Kapı Kilisesi
 Ala Mosque, a former church

Notable people
 Yaşar Kemal, Turkish writer and human rights activist
 Devlet Bahçeli, Turkish politician and current leader of Nationalist Movement Party
 Samet Aybaba, Football manager
 Ahmet Yıldırım, Football manager

Festivals 
 Karakucak Wrestling Festival - Kadirli (25–26 May)

Gallery

See also
Çukurova

References

External links

  Osmaniye governor's official website
  Osmaniye municipality's official website
  Osmaniye Haber
  Osmaniye weather forecast information

 
Çukurova